WXRX (commonly known as "The X") is an FM radio station, broadcasting at 104.9 FM. Licensed to Belvidere, Illinois, the station serves the Rockford, Illinois area. Originally created by a company called "Radio Works" run by David McAley and Robert Rhea Jr., it is now owned by Mid-West Family Broadcasting. WXRX started as a classic rock station.  

WXRX broadcasts two channels in the HD format.

Popular disc jockeys that have worked for WXRX include Jonathon Brandmeier, Tim Crull, Cheryl Jackson as K.C. Meadows, Sky Drysdale, Alan Cox, Jamie Markley, Mark Zander Jim Stone, as Mark Edwards, Lori Hastings, and Pete McMurray.

In the 1992 motion picture Batman Returns, WXRX is a fictional television station in Gotham City.

History
The station went on the air as WKWL on February 27, 1971 playing a "Good Music" format and affiliated with the ABC news network. The 300 foot tower was co-located with the studios on N. Bell School Road in Rockford. A fire in the basement where the transmitter was located burned the entire building to the ground.

The license was acquired in December, 1974, and the station was rebuilt at the Cherryvale Mall. It returned to the air in 1976 with the call letters WYBR (for "We're the Yellow Brick Road"), transmitting from a 300' tower in the Cherryvale parking lot, with studios inside the mall in suite E-114.

The initial format was termed "Theatre of the Mind", and the first airstaff included many people with theatrical background. Actress Susan Saint James was a frequent visitor and contributor to station programming elements. The format gradually migrated to an Adult Contemporary/MOR format in the late 70s. Future WLUP jock Jonathon "Johnny B." Brandmeier was the morning DJ from 1978 to 1980.

The station changed to Top 40 in 1983, then to Classic rock in October, 1986.

RadioWorks, Inc acquired WYBR-FM (and WRRR-AM) in August 1989. Over the next four months, the Company undertook a total upgrade of the station's audio chain.  The debut of WXRX at midnight on January 1, 1990 was supported by an intensive TV advertising campaign.  A year and a half after the debut, WXRX rose to #1 in the market according to the Arbitron report. This displaced WROK and WZOK after a 25-year span where one or the other had been #1 overall in Rockford.

In October 1992 Pete McMurray was hired as WXRX's 1st ever morning DJ, along with Linda Lampert as his co-host and thus "McMurray and Lampert in the Morning" was born. No morning show in the history of WXRX has achieved higher ratings or a bigger following than Pete McMurray and Linda Lampert.  Then after almost 5 years at WXRX Linda Lampert had left in 1996, and then in 1998 after 6 rockin' years at WXRX morning DJ Pete McMurray had also too left for WCKG in Chicago, IL.

From 1992 to 1996 Pete McMurray and Linda Lampert reigned as the king and queen of Rockford morning radio.

References

External links
Official website of WXRX

XRX
Mass media in Rockford, Illinois
Radio stations established in 1971